Glendale is a village in Berkshire County, Massachusetts. It is near Stockbridge, Massachusetts.

Glendale was once an important center of institutions of private and public education. Russell Webb attended Glendale Home School.

In 1904, Glendale Elastic Fabric Company had plans to install new looms at its plant along the river.

Charles Callender established a paper manufacturing plant in Glendale.

Chesterwood is in Glendale at 4 Williamsville Road. 

Glendale is located along the Housatonic River and has a post office.

See also
Glendale Power House

References

Villages in Berkshire County, Massachusetts
Villages in Massachusetts
Stockbridge, Massachusetts